Lorenzo Ruiz (November 28, 1594 – September 29, 1637), also called Saint Lorenzo of Manila, is a Filipino saint venerated in the Catholic Church. A Chinese Filipino, he became his country's protomartyr after his execution in Japan by the Tokugawa Shogunate during its persecution of Japanese Christians in the 17th century.

Lorenzo Ruiz is the patron saint of, among others, the Philippines and the Filipino people.

Early life

Lorenzo Ruiz was born in Binondo, Manila, on 28 November 1594, to a Chinese father and a Filipino mother who were both Catholic. His father taught him Chinese while his mother taught him Tagalog.

Lorenzo served as an altar boy at the Binondo Church. After being educated by the Dominican friars for a few years, Lorenzo earned the title of escribano (scrivener) because of his skillful penmanship. He became a member of the Cofradía del Santísimo Rosario (Confraternity of the Most Holy Rosary). He married Rosario, a native, and they had two sons and a daughter. The Ruiz family led a generally peaceful, religious and content life.

In 1636, whilst working as a clerk for the Binondo Church, Lorenzo was falsely accused of killing a Spaniard. Lorenzo sought asylum on board a ship with three Dominican priests: Antonio Gonzalez, Guillermo Courtet, and Miguel de Aozaraza; a Japanese priest, Vicente Shiwozuka de la Cruz; and a lay leper Lázaro of Kyoto. Lorenzo and his companions sailed for Okinawa on 10 June 1636, with the aid of the Dominican fathers.

Martyrdom

The Tokugawa Shogunate was persecuting Christians, because they feared that was how the Spanish invaded the Philippines by using religion by the time Lorenzo had arrived in Japan. The missionaries were arrested and thrown into prison, and after two years, they were transferred to Nagasaki to face trial by torture. The group endured many and various cruel methods of torture.

On 27 September 1637, Lorenzo and his companions were taken to Nishizaka Hill, where they were tortured by being hung upside-down over a pit. He died two days later on 29 September 1637, aged 42. This form of torture was known as tsurushi (釣殺し) in Japanese or horca y hoya ("gallows and pit") in Spanish. The method, alleged to have been extremely painful, had the victim bound; one hand was always left free so that the individual may signal their desire to recant, leading to their release. Despite his suffering, Lorenzo refused to renounce Christianity and died from eventual blood loss and suffocation. His body was cremated, with the ashes thrown into the sea.

According to Latin missionary accounts sent back to Manila, Lorenzo declared these words upon his death:

Veneration

Cause of beatification and canonization
The Positio Super Introductione Causae or the cause of beatification of Lorenzo Ruiz was written by Spanish historian Fidel Villarroel. The central document found to exhibit Ruiz's martyrdom was an eyewitness account by two Japanese ex-priests from the Society of Jesus, rediscovered by Villaroel at the Jesuit Generalate archive in Rome, an unlikely location as Ruiz was of the Dominican order. Lorenzo was beatified during Pope John Paul II's papal visit to the Philippines in 1981. It was the first beatification ceremony to be held outside the Vatican in history. Lorenzo was canonized by the same pope in the Vatican City on October 18, 1987, among the 16 Martyrs of Japan, making him the first Filipino saint.

Miracle
His canonization was supported by a miracle in October 1983, when Cecilia Alegria Policarpio of Calinog, Iloilo, was cured of brain atrophy (hydrocephalus) at the age of two, after her family and supporters prayed to Lorenzo for his intercession. She was diagnosed with the condition shortly after birth and was treated at University of the East Ramon Magsaysay Memorial Medical Center.

Other tributes
Lorenzo Ruiz is included in American painter John Nava's Communion of Saints Tapestries, a depiction of 135 saints and beati which hangs inside the Cathedral of Our Lady of the Angels in Los Angeles, California.

On September 28, 1997, the 10th anniversary of Lorenzo's canonization was celebrated.

On September 28, 2007, the Catholic Church celebrated the 20th anniversary of Lorenzo's canonization. Then-archbishop of Manila Cardinal Gaudencio Rosales said: "Kahit saan nandoon ang mga Pilipino, ang katapatan sa Diyos ay dala-dala ng Pinoy." ("Wheresoever Filipinos are, the Pinoy brings fidelity to God.")

A mosaic of San Lorenzo is found in the Trinity Dome of Mary's National Shrine in Washington DC.

On September 28, 2017, the 30th anniversary of Lorenzo's canonization was celebrated in the Archdiocese of Manila.

In popular culture

Film and theater
Ang Buhay ni Lorenzo Ruiz, a 1970 Filipino religious biographical film
Lorenzo Ruiz: The Saint... A Filipino, a 1988 Filipino film
Lorenzo, a musical staged in September 2013, by Green Wings Entertainment, with music by Ryan Cayabyab, book and lyrics by Juan Ekis and Paul Dumol, with the collaboration of Joem Antonio, direction by Nonon Padilla, and production by Christopher de Leon.

Books
Carunungan, Celso Al. To Die a Thousand Deaths: A Novel on the Life and Times of Lorenzo Ruiz, Social Studies Publications, Metro Manila, Philippines, 1980.
Delgado, Antonio C. The Making of The First Filipino Saint, The Ala-Ala Foundation, 1982.
Villaroel, Fidel "Lorenzo de Manila: The Protomartyr of the Philippines and His Companions", UST Publishing, Inc., 1988
Dela Peña, Rev. Ordanico "The Birth of the Catholic Philippines in Asia: Includes the Lives of San Lorenzo Ruiz and Blessed Pedro Calungsod", Xlibris Corp., 2000
Diaz, Emo "On The Road With San Lorenzo", UST Publishing, Inc., 2005
Tan, Susan "The Martyrdom Of Saint Lorenzo Ruiz, Pauline Publishing & Media, 2007
Tan, Susan "Martyred: The Story Of Saint Lorenzo Ruiz", Pauline Publishing & Media, 2014

Television
Canonization of Blessed Lorenzo Ruiz TV Special Coverage (PTV 4, 1987)
Saint Lorenzo Ruiz: The Life, A 1st Filipino Saint Documentary Special (PTV 4, 1987)

See also
Ignacia del Espiritu Santo
Jerónima de la Asunción
Kakure Kirishitan
Martha de San Bernardo, the first Filipino nun
Martyrs of Japan
Pedro Calungsod, the second Filipino saint

References

External links

Cause for Beatification
Homily of John Paul II for the beatification of Lorenzo Ruiz
Mosaic in Saint Peter's Basilica
St. Lorenzo Ruiz in the Communion of Saints Tapestries 
St. Lorenzo Ruiz Prayer in times of adversity. Translated into Spanish by José Tlatelpas, traditional version in English and Tagalog. Published in the Canadian Hispanic webzine "La Guirnalda Polar". 
Lorenzo, a musical on the life of Lorenzo Ruiz

1594 births
1637 deaths
17th-century Christian saints
17th-century executions by Japan
17th-century Roman Catholic martyrs
Beatifications by Pope John Paul II
Burials at sea
Canonizations by Pope John Paul II
Deaths from bleeding
Executed Filipino people
Filipino people of Chinese descent
Filipino Roman Catholic saints
Filipino torture victims
History of Christianity in Japan
People from Binondo
People of Spanish colonial Philippines